The 1920 United States Senate election in Oklahoma took place on November 2, 1920. Incumbent Democratic Senator Thomas Gore ran for re-election to a third term. However, he was defeated in the Democratic primary by Congressman Scott Ferris. In the general election, Ferris faced fellow Congressman John W. Harreld, the Republican nominee. Likely helped by Republican presidential nominee Warren G. Harding's victory in Oklahoma over Democratic nominee James M. Cox, Harreld defeated Ferris by a similar margin to Harding's.

Democratic primary

Candidates
 Scott Ferris, U.S. Congressman from Oklahoma's 6th congressional district
 Thomas Gore, incumbent U.S. Senator

Results

Republican primary

Candidates
 John W. Harreld, U.S. Congressman from Oklahoma's 5th congressional district
 James B. Cullison, Oklahoma 21st District Court Judge
 Albert A. Small, Tulsa businessman
 Ernest E. Blake, former Assistant Oklahoma City Attorney
 Edward M. Clark, former State Senator from Payne County and Pawnee County
 Dynamite Ed Perry
 C. Lincoln McGuire
 Ben Thompson, Sapulpa attorney
 Cash M. Cade
 N. D. Welty
 Henry Powers, Oklahoma City police officer
 Warren D. Lindsey
 William Tecumseh Clark
 Summer T. Bisbe

Results

Socialist Primary

Candidates
 A. A. Bagwell, former instructor at Henry Kendall College

Results

General election

Results

References

Oklahoma
1920
1920 Oklahoma elections